Darreh-ye Abbas or Darreh Abbas may refer to:

Darreh-ye Abbas, Lorestan
Darreh Abbas, South Khorasan